The men's 5000 metres event at the 1994 Commonwealth Games was held on 22 and 24 August at the Centennial Stadium in Victoria, British Columbia.

Medalists

Results

Heats

Final

References

5000
1994